Gömürgen is a village in the district of Akkışla, Kayseri Province, Turkey.

History
Gömürgen lies in Anatolia, one of the earliest settled areas in the world. Exact data for the establishment of the village are not well known. It is believed that between 1594 and 1644 seven Turkmeni families emigrated from Central Asia to the area, and continue to live there as sheep breeders.

Geography
Gömürgen is in Akkışla district, which lies in the province of Kayseri. It is 6 kilometers from Akkışla and 86 kilometers from Kayseri. To the east and southeast lies the Hınzır mountain and the village Ortaköy. Akkışla lies to the west of Gömürgen. South of Gömürgen, also in the district of Akkisla, is the district Uğurlu and the village Ganışeh.

Gömürgen lies over 1400-1500m above sea level. The vegetation is desertlike.  Constant grazing and clearing of the ground around the area to convert it to pastureland, results in the desertlike vegetation, as well as creating erosion with associated dangers.

Division of the town 
 Yeşil Mahalle
 Cumhuriyet Mahalle
 Yeni Mahalle

Mayor

References

External links 
 Municipality Gömürgen
 Derviş Çakırtekin Basic School and Junior High 
 Association Hilfswerk Gömürgen e.V
 Spring in Gömürgen

Villages in Kayseri Province